Harald Punt (born 18 February 1952) is a retired Dutch rower who won three silver medals at the World Lightweight Rowing Championships in 1974, 1978 and 1979 in the single and double sculls (with Roel Michels).

Punt is a boatbuilder and speaks Dutch and German. After retiring from competitions he worked as a rowing coach, particularly with Andreas and Irene Schmelz.

References

1952 births
Living people
Dutch male rowers
Rowing coaches
Sportspeople from Leiden
World Rowing Championships medalists for the Netherlands